Prisad is a village in General Toshevo Municipality, Dobrich Province, in northeastern Bulgaria.

Honours
Prisad Island in Antarctica is named after the village.

References

Villages in Dobrich Province